Sherron Mills (July 29, 1971 – January 17, 2016) was an American basketball player from Salisbury, Maryland. A 6'9" forward, he played for Snow Hill High School, leading the team to the 1989 Maryland 1-A Boys Basketball State Championship.

He played college ball for Virginia Commonwealth University. He was drafted 29th overall in the 1993 NBA Draft by the Minnesota Timberwolves. He did not make an NBA roster, but played professionally in Europe.

Playing in the Italian Serie A for Cx Orologi Siena during the 1995–96, he topped the league in rebounding.

Mills died at a hospital in Baltimore, Maryland from complications of amyotrophic lateral sclerosis (ALS) on January 17, 2016, at the age of 44.

References

External links
Italian League profile
Liga ACB profile

1971 births
2016 deaths
American expatriate basketball people in France
American expatriate basketball people in Italy
American expatriate basketball people in Spain
American expatriate basketball people in Turkey
American men's basketball players
Basketball players from Maryland
Bàsquet Manresa players
BCM Gravelines players
Chowan Hawks men's basketball players
Neurological disease deaths in Maryland
Deaths from motor neuron disease
Galatasaray S.K. (men's basketball) players
Junior college men's basketball players in the United States
Lega Basket Serie A players
Liga ACB players
Mens Sana Basket players
Minnesota Timberwolves draft picks
People from Salisbury, Maryland
People from Snow Hill, Maryland
Power forwards (basketball)
Saski Baskonia players
VCU Rams men's basketball players